Bucharest North railway station (officially Bucharest North Group A) is the main railway station in Bucharest and the largest railway station in Romania. The vast majority of mainline trains to and from Bucharest originate from Gara de Nord.

History
The station was built between 1868 and 1872; the foundation stone was set on 10 September 1868 in the presence of Carol I of Romania. The building is designed as a U-shaped structure. The first railways between Roman – Galați – Bucharest – Pitești were put in service on 13 September 1872. Between 1895 and 1896 a new wing of the station was built, which included a "Royal Hall", due to the visit of Emperor Franz Joseph of Austria-Hungary.
It was initially named Gara Târgoviștei, after the road nearby, Calea Târgoviștei ("Târgoviște Road", nowadays Calea Griviței), and took its current name in 1888.

Prior to the mid 1930s, the station's tracks extended beyond the present-day square, into a group of carriage workshops that were demolished to make way for the Ministry of Railways building, which began to be built in 1938 but was only finished in 1950. Also in 1938, the second building (colloquially known as "The Columns") was completed. The station and its surroundings were heavily bombed by the Allies in April 1944 during a campaign aimed at the Axis supply lines, since the station played an important part in the Romanian railway network and was the main departure point for troops headed to the Eastern Front (see: Bombing of Bucharest in World War II).

Under Communist times, the station received a number of upgrades, such as partial electrification on 16 February 1969, followed by an expansion between 1978 and 1984 and complete electrification. It is still upgraded as of today, having received a platform overhaul (replacement of tiles with asphalt from 2006 to 2010), removal of the "temporary" footbridge built in 1927 (replaced with the Basarab Overpass in 2009) and, in 2018, replacement of the original split-flap displays with LED ones.

During the Russian invasion of Ukraine in 2022, the station hosted, starting on 27 February 2022, Ukrainian refugees. Only during the first day, almost 100 Ukrainian refugees arrived with 5 trains owned by the state operation, CFR Călători, and came from the direction of Iași and Suceava. The Ukrainian citizens were immediately picked up by the station security staff and transported to the station waiting room, where a special area for refugees was arranged, and where they were offered water and food. Throughout their stay at the station, displaced persons from Ukraine received help from representatives of Bucharest City Hall and NGOs, through a non-stop information and coordination point arranged on the central platform, where volunteers who speak Ukrainian may provide additional information; information was also presented in English through loudspeakers. On March 4, 2022, at midnight, about 1,000 refugees arrived from Iasi with a train set with 11 wagons, which were later transported by several buses owned by STB to be accommodated at Romexpo.

Current status 
There are currently 14 tracks and 8 platforms.

As of 2009, Gara de Nord served about 200 trains, including domestic trains operated by Căile Ferate Române, Regiotrans and Trans Feroviar calatori as well international trains to Hungary – Budapest, Bulgaria – Sofia, Varna and Burgas, Republic of Moldova – Chișinău, Ukraine – Kyiv, Dnipro and Chernivtsi, Austria – Vienna,  Turkey – Istanbul, Russia – Moscow and Saratov, Belarus – Minsk.

The station is served by several bus (lines 105, 123, 133, 178, 182, 205, 282 and express line 780 which links the railway station with the Henri Coandă Airport) trolleybus (65, 79 and 86 on Grivița side and 62, 85, 93, 96 on The Columnes side) and tram lines (42, 45, 46 on Grivița side and 44 on Dinicu Golescu side), as well as the Gara de Nord metro station. Also, the station is connected by CFR and TFC trains to Henri Coandă International Airport.

Future developments
In 2019 plans were announced by the Government of Romania's Ministry of Transport to convert Gara de Nord from a terminus station to an underground through station, linking with Bucharest Obor railway station, and a partial underground link between Gara de Nord and Progresul.

See also
Bucharest Metro

References

External links
 
 Trains timetable
 Station North Bucharest

Gara de Nord
Gara de Nord
Bucuresti Gara de Nord
Historic monuments in Bucharest
1872 establishments in Romania
19th-century architecture in Romania